Konrad Pecher (born 13 December 1930) is an Austrian former speed skater. He competed in three events at the 1952 Winter Olympics.

References

External links
  

1930 births
Possibly living people
Austrian male speed skaters
Olympic speed skaters of Austria
Speed skaters at the 1952 Winter Olympics
Place of birth missing (living people)